1786 in sports describes the year's events in world sport.

Boxing
Events
 11 January — Tom Johnson defeated Bill Lowe at Barnet in the first round after four minutes.
 11 February — Tom Johnson defeated Jack Towers at Barnet in a 15-minute fight.
 31 October — "Big" Ben Brain defeated "The Fighting Grenadier" John Boone at Long Fields in a 30 to 40 minute fight, depending on the source.

Cricket
Events
 Tom Sueter of Hampshire was given out for hitting the ball twice, the first recorded instance of this type of dismissal.
 First-class debut of the noted opening batsman Tom Walker, who is believed to have invented roundarm bowling.
England
 Most runs – Tom Walker 423 
 Most wickets – Robert Clifford 23

Horse racing
England
 The Derby – Noble
 The Oaks – Yellow Filly
 St Leger Stakes – Paragon
 The inaugural July Stakes was run at Newmarket Racecourse and is the oldest race for two-year-olds still run in Great Britain.

References

 
1786